Daniil Markovich Gleikhengauz (or Gleichenhaus; , born 3 June 1991) is a Russian former ice dancer and single skater. In single skating, he is the 2007 Russian junior national bronze medalist and competed at the 2007 World Junior Championships, placing 19th. He was coached by Viktor Kudriavtsev.

Gleikhengauz began competing in ice dancing in the 2010–11 season, with partner Ksenia Korobkova. They made their international debut the following season, winning the junior title at the 2011 NRW Trophy. They were coached by Alexander Zhulin and Oleg Volkov.

After his father's death, Gleikhengauz retired from his competitive career and began performing in Ilia Averbukh's ice show. Later he began coaching and in 2014 he became a choreographer in Eteri Tutberidze's team at Sambo-70 in Moscow. His mother, Lyudmila Borisovna Shalashova, former ballet dancer and ballet teacher, who also worked with Eteri Tutberidze's team, died on 29 August 2019.

Programs

Competitive highlights
JGP: Junior Grand Prix

Ice dancing with Korobkova

Men's singles

References

External links
 
 

Russian male ice dancers
Russian male single skaters
Russian people of Jewish descent
1991 births
Living people
Figure skaters from Moscow
Figure skating choreographers